Redux '92: Live in Japan is an album by the rock band Utopia recorded live on May 10, 1992 at Gotanda Kani Hoken Hall, Tokyo, Japan and released in early 1993. It captures the band's reunion six years after it had disbanded in 1986.  The album ostensibly consists of the "best of" as selected by the members Todd Rundgren, Roger Powell, Kasim Sulton, and John "Willie" Wilcox. A companion video of the same performance was released on DVD and VHS tape.

Track listing

Personnel
Roger Powell - vocals, keyboards
Todd Rundgren - vocals, guitars, production/engineering
Kasim Sulton - bass guitars, vocals
John "Willie" Wilcox - drums, percussions, electronics

References

External links 
  Leading Fan-maintained Site
  Live Internet Radio Station for Rundgren

Todd Rundgren albums
Albums produced by Todd Rundgren
Utopia (band) albums
1993 live albums
Rhino Records live albums